Finland participated in the Eurovision Song Contest 1998 with the song "Aava" written by Alexi Ahoniemi and Tommy Mansikka-Aho. The song was performed by the group Edea. The Finnish broadcaster Yleisradio (Yle) returned to the Eurovision Song Contest after a one-year absence following their relegation from 1997 as one of the six countries with the least average points over the preceding four contests. Yle organised the national final Euroviisut 1998 in order to select the Finnish entry for the 1998 contest in Birmingham, United Kingdom. Nine entries were selected to compete in the national final on 14 February 1998 where the combination of votes from an eight-member expert jury, an eight-member OGAE jury and votes from the public selected "Aava" performed by Edea as the winner.

Finland competed in the Eurovision Song Contest which took place on 9 May 1998. Performing during the show in position 21, Finland placed fifteenth out of the 25 participating countries, scoring 22 points.

Background 

Prior to the 1998 contest, Finland had participated in the Eurovision Song Contest thirty-four times since its first entry in 1961. Finland's best result in the contest achieved in 1973 where the song "Tom Tom Tom" performed by Marion Rung placed sixth. The Finnish national broadcaster, Yleisradio (Yle), broadcasts the event within Finland and organises the selection process for the nation's entry. Finland's entries for the Eurovision Song Contest have been selected through national final competitions that have varied in format over the years. Since 1961, a selection show that was often titled Euroviisukarsinta highlighted that the purpose of the program was to select a song for Eurovision. The broadcaster selected the Finnish entry for the 1998 contest again through the Euroviisut selection show.

Before Eurovision

Euroviisut 1998 
Euroviisut 1998 was the national final that selected Finland's entry for the Eurovision Song Contest 1998. The competition consisted of a final on 14 February 1998, held at the Yle Studio 2 in Helsinki and hosted by Finnish presenter Olga K and Finnish presenter/producer/director Sami Aaltonen. The show was broadcast on Yle TV1 and was watched by 1.21 million viewers in Finland.

Competing entries 
A panel of six experts appointed by Yle selected nine entries for the competition from the 189 submissions received during a submission period and from composers directly invited by the broadcaster. Seven of the competing entries came from the invited composers, while the remaining two entries came from the open submission.

Final 
The final took place on 14 February 1998 where nine entries competed. "Aava" performed by Edea was selected as the winner by a combination of public votes (1/3), an expert jury (1/3) and a panel of Finnish and international OGAE members (1/3). Each voting group distributed their points as follows: 1, 2, 3, 4, 5, 6, 7, 8 and 10 points. 16,708 votes were cast during the show. In addition to the performances of the competing entries, the interval act featured Combayah and Sarah Brightman.

At Eurovision 
According to Eurovision rules, all nations with the exceptions of the eight countries which had obtained the lowest average number of points over the last five contests competed in the final on 9 May 1998. On 13 November 1997, a special allocation draw was held which determined the running order and Finland was set to perform in position 21, following the entry from Belgium and before the entry from Norway. The day before the contest, Finland was considered by bookmakers to be the seventeenth most likely country to win the competition. The Finnish conductor at the contest was Olli Ahvenlahti, and Finland finished in fifteenth place with 22 points.

The show was televised in Finland on Yle TV1 with commentary by Maria Guzenina and Sami Aaltonen. The show was also broadcast via radio with Finnish commentary by Sanna Kojo on Yle Radio Suomi and with Swedish commentary on Yle Radio Vega. The Finnish spokesperson, who announced the Finnish votes during the final, was Marjo Wilska.

Voting 
Below is a breakdown of points awarded to Finland and awarded by Finland in the contest. The nation awarded its 12 points to Estonia in the contest.

References

External links
 Full national final on Yle Elävä Arkisto

1998
Countries in the Eurovision Song Contest 1998
Eurovision